In mathematics, the Veblen functions are a hierarchy of normal functions (continuous strictly increasing functions from ordinals to ordinals), introduced by Oswald Veblen in . If φ0 is any normal function, then for any non-zero ordinal α, φα is the function enumerating the common fixed points of φβ for β<α. These functions are all normal.

The Veblen hierarchy 
In the special case when  φ0(α)=ωα
this family of functions is known as the Veblen hierarchy. 
The function φ1 is the same as the ε function: φ1(α)= εα. If  then . From this and the fact that φβ is strictly increasing we get the ordering:  if and only if either ( and ) or ( and ) or ( and ).

Fundamental sequences for the Veblen hierarchy 
The fundamental sequence for an ordinal with cofinality ω is a distinguished strictly increasing ω-sequence which has the ordinal as its limit. If one has fundamental sequences for α and all smaller limit ordinals, then one can create an explicit constructive bijection between ω and α, (i.e. one not using the axiom of choice). Here we will describe fundamental sequences for the Veblen hierarchy of ordinals. The image of n under the fundamental sequence for α will be indicated by α[n].

For any β, if γ is a limit with  then let 

No such sequence can be provided for  = ω0 = 1 because it does not have cofinality ω.

For  we choose 

For  we use  and  i.e. 0, etc..

For , we use  and 

Now suppose that β is a limit:

If , then let 

For , use 

Otherwise, the ordinal cannot be described in terms of smaller ordinals using  and this scheme does not apply to it.

The Γ function
The function Γ enumerates the ordinals α such that φα(0) = α. 
Γ0 is the Feferman–Schütte ordinal, i.e. it is the smallest α such that φα(0) = α.

For Γ0, a fundamental sequence could be chosen to be  and 

For Γβ+1, let  and 

For Γβ where  is a limit, let

Generalizations

Finitely many variables
To build the Veblen function of a finite number of arguments (finitary Veblen function), let the binary function  be  as defined above.

The finitary Veblen functions are defined as follows:
 
 
 if , then  denotes the -th common fixed point of the functions  for each 

Each instance of the generalized Veblen functions is continuous in the last nonzero variable (i.e., if one variable is made to vary and all later variables are kept constantly equal to zero).

The ordinal  is sometimes known as the Ackermann ordinal.  The limit of the  where the number of zeroes ranges over ω, is sometimes known as the "small" Veblen ordinal.

Every non-zero ordinal  less than the small Veblen ordinal (SVO) can be uniquely written in normal form for the finitary Veblen function:

where
  is a positive integer
 
  is a string consisting of one or more comma-separated ordinals  where  and each

Fundamental sequences for limit ordinals of finitary Veblen function 

For limit ordinals , written in normal form for the finitary Veblen function:
 ,
 ,
  if  is a limit ordinal,

Transfinitely many variables
More generally, Veblen showed that φ can be defined even for a transfinite sequence of ordinals αβ, provided that all but a finite number of them are zero. Notice that if such a sequence of ordinals is chosen from those less than an uncountable regular cardinal κ, then the sequence may be encoded as a single ordinal less than κκ (ordinal exponentiation). So one is defining a function φ from κκ into κ.

The definition can be given as follows: let α be a transfinite sequence of ordinals (i.e., an ordinal function with finite support) which ends in zero (i.e., such that α0=0), and let α[γ@0] denote the same function where the final 0 has been replaced by γ.  Then γ↦φ(α[γ@0]) is defined as the function enumerating the common fixed points of all functions ξ↦φ(β) where β ranges over all sequences which are obtained by decreasing the smallest-indexed nonzero value of α and replacing some smaller-indexed value with the indeterminate ξ (i.e., β=α[ζ@ι0,ξ@ι] meaning that for the smallest index ι0 such that αι0 is nonzero the latter has been replaced by some value ζ<αι0 and that for some smaller index ι<ι0, the value αι=0 has been replaced with ξ).

For example, if α=(1@ω) denotes the transfinite sequence with value 1 at ω and 0 everywhere else, then φ(1@ω) is the smallest fixed point of all the functions ξ↦φ(ξ,0,...,0) with finitely many final zeroes (it is also the limit of the φ(1,0,...,0) with finitely many zeroes, the small Veblen ordinal).

The smallest ordinal α such that α is greater than φ applied to any function with support in α (i.e., which cannot be reached "from below" using the Veblen function of transfinitely many variables) is sometimes known as the "large" Veblen ordinal, or "great" Veblen number.

Values
The function takes on several prominent values:
 , a bound on the order types of the recursive path orderings with finitely many function symbols. 

References

 Hilbert Levitz, Transfinite Ordinals and Their Notations: For The Uninitiated, expository article (8 pages, in PostScript)

 contains an informal description of the Veblen hierarchy.

Ordinal numbers
Proof theory
Hierarchy of functions